Françoise Dunand (born 1934) is a French historian, professor emeritus of the University of Strasbourg. She is a specialist in Greek and Roman Egypt.

Career 
Since 1981, Françoise Dunand has been leading the "Alpha Necropolis" team to excavate the necropolises at the Kharga Oasis in Egypt. She is a former member of the Institut Français d'Archéologie Orientale (IFAO) in Cairo, she has published a number of books and articles on late Egyptian religious beliefs and practices. The findings at Duch are partly presented in her book .

She participated in the writing of a collective work  by signing in the second chapter entitled , an article .

Awards 
 1999: Prix Clio for archaeological research – Special Jury Prize for her Etude archéologique et anthropologique de la nécropole d'El Deioasis de Kharga
 2002: Prix Clio for archaeological research – for her Kharga

Selected publications 
 Co-author with Roger Lichtenberg, Les momies : Un voyage dans l'éternité, collection « Découvertes Gallimard » (nº 118), série Archéologie. Éditions Gallimard, 1991 (new edition in 2007)
 US edition – Mummies: A Voyage Through Eternity, "Abrams Discoveries" series. Harry N. Abrams, 1994
 UK edition – Mummies: A Journey Through Eternity, 'New Horizons' series. Thames & Hudson, 1994
 Co-author with Roger Lichtenberg, Les égyptiens, coll. « Les grandes civilisations ». Éditions du Chêne, 2004
 Co-author with Christiane Zivie-Coche, Gods and Men in Egypt: 3000 BCE to 395 CE, Cornell University Press, 2004
 Co-author with Roger Lichtenberg, Mummies and Death in Egypt, Cornell University Press, 2007
 Isis, mère des dieux, coll. « Babel ». Actes Sud, 2008
 Participated in the collective work
 AA.VV., La mort et l'immortalité : Encyclopédie des savoirs et des croyances, Bayard, 2004

Documentary 
 (lit. 'The Mummies of the Desert'), a 13-minute short documentary film about Françoise Dunand's archaeological dig at the Kharga Oasis, directed by Serge Tignères and Alain Zenou. It is part of the DVD  from Arte's documentary series The Human Adventure, and available in English.

References 

1934 births
French Egyptologists
20th-century French writers
Academic staff of the University of Strasbourg
Living people